Emperor Frederick III may refer to:
Frederick III, Holy Roman Emperor (1415–1493)
Frederick III, German Emperor, (1831–1888)

See also
Frederick III (disambiguation)